Isa Oomayoualook was an Inuit sculptor.

His work is included in the collections of the Musée national des beaux-arts du Québec and the Canadian Museum of History

References

1915 births
1976 deaths
20th-century Canadian artists
Inuit artists